Bartolomeo Sebastian "Bart" Ruspoli (born 8 November 1976 in London) is an Italian and English actor.

Career 
Bart Ruspoli trained at the Webber Douglas Academy of Dramatic Art, where he graduated in 1998. He is also the writer and Producer of two of the films he was in.

In 2022 he was nominated for a BAFTA for Outstanding British Film for “Boiling Point” which he produced.

Filmography 
 2point4 Children (1 episode, "The Italian Job", 1998) .... Fabrizio
 Heartbeat (1 episode, "Wise Guys", 2000) .... Marco Mazzetti
 Fish (1 episode, "Another Shade of White", 2000) .... Antonio - pizza delivery boy
 Jack Brown and the Curse of the Crown (2001) .... Malook
 Dead Creatures (2001) (V) .... Christian
 Band of Brothers (3 episodes, "Carentan", "Currahee" and "Day of Days", 2001) TV mini-series .... Pvt. Edward Tipper
 The Long Night (2002) (V) .... Joe (also Writer and Producer)
 Four (2002) (TV) .... Nick (also Writer and Producer)
 Ghost Master (2003) (VG) .... Ghostmaster (Italian version)
 Venus Drowning (2005) .... John
 Empire (2005) TV mini-series .... Principe
 Rome (2 episodes, "The Stolen Eagle" and "How Titus Pullo Brought Down the Republic", 2005) .... Antony's Tribune
 Elizabeth David: A Life in Recipes (2006) (TV) .... Doctor
 I Said So Little (2006) (V) .... Postman
 EastEnders (5 episodes, 2007) .... Marco
 Mixed Up (2009) .... Mike
 The Devil's Playground (2010) .... Matt
 Genesis (2018) .... Matt

Personal life 
He is the great-grandson of Mario Ruspoli, 2nd Prince of Poggio Suasa, great-great-nephew of Bartolomeo Ruspoli, and wife Pauline Marie Palma de Talleyrand-Périgord, great-great-great-niece of Charles Maurice de Talleyrand-Périgord. He is 6' 1" (1.85 m). 
Ruspoli is also a fifth cousin of occasional actor Alessandro Ruspoli, 9th Prince of Cerveteri and once removed of his son director Tao Ruspoli, son of actress Debra Berger and used to be married to actress Olivia Wilde. He is the oldest son of Costantino Filippo Maria dei Principi Ruspoli dei Principi di Poggio Suasa, born in New York City, New York on 23 April 1947, by Maria Consuelo (Lily) Child-Villiers of the Earls of Jersey, born on 21 August 1953, a former niece by marriage of Virginia Cherrill and paternal granddaughter of George Child Villiers, 8th Earl of Jersey, who despite their equal aristocratic birth never married to each other. Bart married Dr Vanessa Schjelderup in June 2012.

His second cousin (first cousin once removed) is actor, writer and producer William Villiers, 10th Earl of Jersey.

See also 
 Ruspoli

References

External links 
 

1976 births
Living people
Alumni of the Webber Douglas Academy of Dramatic Art
Bart
English male film actors
Italian male film actors
English male television actors
Italian male television actors
Italian untitled nobility